Sisto Reina (Saronno 1623? — Modena after 1664) was an Italian composer, minorite monk, and organist. His musical publications were made while he was maestro di cappella in the church of S. Francesco in Piacenza.

Works, editions and recordings
 «Novelli fiori ecclesiastici, Mottetti e Messe a 8, op. prima, Milano 1648». 
Recordings
 Dialogo di Lazzaro - on Canti nel Chiostro, Cappella Artemisia dir. Candace Smith (musicologist). Tactus
 Surge filiae Sion - on Soror mea, Sponsa mea: Canticum Canticorum nei Conventi Capella Artemisia dir. Candace Smith. Tactus 2005
 De profundis clamavi - on Schätze aus Uppsala Les Cornets Noirs, Raumklang 2011
Armonia Ecclesiastica op.5 Concentus Vocum  Tactus 2016

References

External links
 HOASM: Sisto Reina
 
 Artemisia Editions - Sisto Reina

Italian organists
Male organists